Spencer Leigh (born 1 February 1945) is a BBC radio presenter and author, with particular expertise in the development of pop and rock music and culture in Britain.

Career
Leigh started broadcasting on BBC Radio Merseyside in the early 1970s. His first series, No Holds Bard, was based around the Mersey poets. His music programme On the Beat ran continuously from 1985 to 2020 on BBC Radio Merseyside. Over the years, Leigh interviewed thousands of musicians on the show. The entire collection of 2,027 programmes has been given to Liverpool's Central Library, and there is an on-going project to archive them. Some one-off series have been given to the British Library.

His first book was Paul Simon - Now and Then, published in 1973, which was the first biography of the American singer-songwriter Paul Simon. Since then, Leigh has written, or collaborated on, over two dozen books. Many of his books relate to The Beatles or Merseybeat, and he has interviewed many people connected to the Liverpool 1960s scene. There have been several one-off series on BBC Radio Merseyside, the best known being Let's Go Down the Cavern (1981), which was also broadcast on local BBC stations throughout the UK.

Leigh has written the sleeve notes or CD booklets for over 300 albums. He writes obituaries of musicians for The Guardian, The Independent, and the Oxford Dictionary of National Biography; he has also written extensively for Record Collector, Country Music People and Now Dig This. He has a weekly 'My City' column every Saturday in the Liverpool Echo. 

His history of British pop before the Beatles, Halfway To Paradise (1996), has been expanded and issued in two volumes as British Pop Before The Beatles, available only on Kindle. He has written a series of musical biographies for McNidder & Grace: Frank Sinatra (updated with 50 pages of lists in 2022), Elvis Presley, Buddy Holly and Simon & Garfunkel.

For the sixtieth anniversary of the Beatles' first Parlophone single, "Love Me Do", he and Mike Jones wrote The Road to Love Me Do, which was published in September 2022. It tells the story of Merseybeat through the Liverpool artists who came before the Beatles, and details numerous private recordings made by local bands prior to October 1962. The music is highlighted with QR codes, and is the first such book to use QR codes in this way.

Publications
 Paul Simon - Now and Then (1973)
 Presley Nation (1976)
 Stars In My Eyes - Personal Interviews With Top Music Stars (1980)
 Let’s Go Down the Cavern (1984)
 Speaking Words of Wisdom (1991)
 Halfway to Paradise, Britpop 1955–1962 (1996)
 Drummed Out! - The Sacking of Pete Best (1998)  
 Baby, That Is Rock and Roll, American Pop, 1954–1963 (2000)
 Brother, Can You Spare a Rhyme? - 100 Years Of Hit Songwriting (2001)
 Puttin' on the Style - The Lonnie Donegan Story (2002)
 Sweeping the Blues Away - A Celebration of the Merseysippi Jazz Band (2002)
 The Best of Fellas - The Story of Bob Wooler, Liverpool's First DJ (2002)
 Twist and Shout! - Merseybeat, the Cavern, the Star-Club and the Beatles (2004)
 Sound! - The Liverpool Pop Quiz Book (2004)
 Wondrous Face - The Billy Fury Story (2005)
 Things Do Go Wrong (2008; Kindle 2012)
 The Cavern - The Most Famous Club in the World (2008)
 Everyday - Getting Closer to Buddy Holly (2009)
 Tomorrow Never Knows: The Beatles on Record (2010)
 It's Love That Really Counts - The Billy Kinsley Story (2010)
 The Beatles in Hamburg (2011)
 The Beatles in Liverpool (2012) Republished in paperback, 2014
 The Beatles in America (2013)
 British Pop Before The Beatles: Volume 1 The Story (2015) ebook
 British Pop Before The Beatles: Volume 2 The Profiles (2015) ebook
 American Pop Before The Beatles (2015)ebook
 Best Of The Beatles: The Sacking Of Pete Best (2015) Updated 'Drummed Out. Paperback and ebook
 Frank Sinatra: An Extraordinary Life (2015) (Updated with 50 pages of lists and an index, 2022)
 The Cavern Club: The Rise of the Beatles and Merseybeat (June 2016) Revised and updated version of 'The Cavern' 
 Simon and Garfunkel: Together Alone (2016)
 Love Me Do to Love Me Don't: The Beatles on Record (June 2016) Revised version of 'Tomorrow Never Knows'
 Elvis Presley: Caught In A Trap (2017)
 Buddy Holly: Learning The Game (January 2019) Revised and updated version of 'Everyday - Getting Closer to Buddy Holly'
 Could This Be Magic? The Story of Doo-Wop (April 2020) (only available as an e-book)
 Bob Dylan: Outlaw Blues (July 2020) 

Spencer Leigh has also written or collaborated on the following books with other authors: 
 Memories of Buddy Holly with Jim Dawson (1996)
 The Walrus Was Ringo - 101 Beatles Myths Debunked (2002) by Alan Clayson and Spencer Leigh
 1000 UK Number One Hits (2005) by Jon Kutner and Spencer Leigh
 Aspects of Elvis - Tryin' To Get To You (1994) edited by Alan Clayson and Spencer Leigh
 Behind the Song - The Stories of 100 Great Pop and Rock Classics (1998) by Michael Heatley and Spencer Leigh
 The Beatles Book (Hunter Davies (2016) with Keith Badman, David Bedford and Spencer Leigh)
 Congratulations: Songwriter to the Stars Bill Martin's biography, ghosted by Spencer Leigh (2017)
 30-Second Rock Music ([Mike Evans]) (2018) Edited by Mike Evans with Gillian Gaar, Patrick Humphries Paul Kingsbury, Spencer Leigh and Hugh Weldon 
 The Road to Love Me Do: The Beatles and their Liverpool Contemporaries (September 2022) with Mike Jones

References

1945 births
Living people
British radio presenters
Radio presenters from Liverpool
English music journalists